Giorgos Kritikos (born 24 August 1992) is a Greek footballer, who currently plays for Super League 2 club Ilioupoli as a centre back. 

He started his career with AO Haidari and played at Football League 2 and Delta Ethniki aged 17. He then played for P.A.O. Rouf and Atromitos Piraeus before he earns his transfer to Ionikos, in which he became a first team regular for three seasons. In July 2017, he transferred to Ethnikos Piraeus.

References
  Transfer to Ethnikos
 Ethnikos Piraeus 2017/18

1992 births
Living people
Greek footballers
Chaidari F.C. players
Rouf F.C. players
Atromitos Piraeus F.C. players
Ionikos F.C. players
Ethnikos Piraeus F.C. players
Association football central defenders
Footballers from Central Greece
People from Phthiotis